El Tepehuaje de Morelos is a town in the municipality of San Martín de Hidalgo in the state of Jalisco, Mexico. It has a population of 2,331. The town was named after Mexican independence insurgent José María Morelos.

References

External links
El Tepehuaje de Morelos at PueblosAmerica.com

Populated places in Jalisco